A. K. M. Bahauddin Bahar' is a Awami League politician and the incumbent Member of Parliament from Comilla-6.

Early life
Bahauddin was born on 28 February 1954. He graduated with a bachelor of arts degree.

Career
Bahauddin was elected to Parliament in 2008 from Comilla-6 as a candidate of Awami League. He had received 126 thousand votes while his nearest competitor, Mohammad Amin Ur Rashid Yeasin of Bangladesh Nationalist Party, received 102 thousand votes. He served in the parliamentary standing committee on the Ministry of Social Welfare.

Bahauddin was elected to parliament from Comilla-6 in 2014 as a candidate of Awami League. He had received 59 thousand votes while his nearest competitor, Director-FBCCI Masud Parvez Khan Imran who stood as an Independent candidate received 38 thousand votes. The general election was boycotted by all major parties and Awami League had won majority of the seats uncontested.

On 15 October 2014, Bahauddin sued three staff members of Independent TV and its owner Salman F Rahman. He filed a case over a report on 29 September 2014 titled Several ministers, MPs patrons of BNP-Jamaat misdeeds.

On 10 May 2015, supports of Bahauddin and Mujibul Haque Mujib clashed in the Comilla Town hall resulting in the death of one activist of Bangladesh Chhatra League.

Members of the Awami League secretariat called for official action against Bahauddin over his role in the Comilla City Corporation poll in April 2017. He had refused to work for the Awami League candidate of mayor, Anjum Sultana Sima, as he was a rival of her father, Afzal Khan. Monirul Haque Sakku, candidate of Bangladesh Nationalist Party, defeated Anjum Sultana Sima in the election as a result of Awami League's internal conflicts.

Bahauddin served in the parliamentary standing committee on commerce. The committee recommended that the Trading Corporation of Bangladesh should select dealers through the recommendation of Members of Parliament. Bahauddin stated that dealers who were appointed on the recommendation of Members of Parliament that "acted properly".

Bahauddin was re-elected to Parliament from Comilla-6 in 2018 as a candidate of Awami League in a landslide. He had received 296 thousand votes while is closest rival, Md Aminur Rashid of Bangladesh Nationalist Party, had received 18 thousand votes.

Bahauddin request Comilla District administration to demolish Birchandra Ganapathagar (also known as Cumilla Town Hall) and replace it with a modern structure. The Daily Star was critical of the decision and described the 135 year old town hall as "historic". He is an advisor to the town hall. Following protests of the decision the Ministry of Cultural Affairs called for a mass hearing to decide the fate of the town hall. Anjum Sultana Sima, Member of Parliament from reserved seat, blamed Bahauddin for instigating the demolition of the town hall. His supporters crowded the mass hearing and left no room for citizens to participate on 20 December 2020.

Bahauddin threatened the deputy director of Department of Environment in Comilla District, Shawkat Ara Kol,  after she had inspected a site of Roads and Highway Department for environmental impact. She had also issued notices to contractors of the Roads and Highway Department.

References

Awami League politicians
Living people
10th Jatiya Sangsad members
11th Jatiya Sangsad members
9th Jatiya Sangsad members
Comilla Victoria Government College alumni
1954 births